Johnville Football Club is an Irish association football club based in Waterford and founded in 1959.

Notable former players

Republic of Ireland internationals
  Stephen Hunt

Republic of Ireland U21 internationals
  Alan Kirby

Republic of Ireland U23 internationals
  Kenny Browne

References

Association football clubs in County Waterford
Association football clubs established in 1959
1959 establishments in Ireland
Association football academies in the Republic of Ireland